Magnificent! is an album by pianist Barry Harris recorded in 1969 and released on the Prestige label.

Reception

Allmusic awarded the album 4 stars with its review by Jim Todd stating, "Magnificent brilliantly illustrates Barry Harris' unique rapport with the bop piano tradition. Absolutely unlike the enervating, curatorial approach of the neo-con movement, Harris deals with the tradition as a continuum, perpetually rejuvenating and extending it".
Awarding the album a maximum four-star rating, The Penguin Guide to Jazz identified it as part of their recommended "core collection".

Track listing 
All compositions by Barry Harris except as indicated
 "Bean and the Boys" (Coleman Hawkins) - 6:41  
 "You Sweet and Fancy Lady" - 4:04  
 "Rouge" - 4:15  
 "Ah-Leu-Cha" (Charlie Parker) - 4:00  
 "Just Open Your Heart" - 6:05  
 "Sun Dance" - 4:21  
 "These Foolish Things" (Harry Link, Holt Marvell, Jack Strachey) - 5:20  
 "Dexterity" (Parker) - 4:27

Personnel 
Barry Harris - piano
Ron Carter - bass
Leroy Williams - drums

References 

Barry Harris albums
1969 albums
Prestige Records albums
Albums produced by Don Schlitten